Bamou is a 1983 Moroccan film directed by Driss Mrini.

Synopsis 
The film tells the love story of a couple struggling against foreign occupation.

Cast 

 Badia Rayana 
 Mohamed Hassan Al Joundi
 Mohamed Habachi
 Larbi Doghmi

References 

1983 films
1980s Arabic-language films
Moroccan drama films